Şiran is a town and district of Gümüşhane Province in the Black Sea region of Turkey. It is one of the points of passage between Eastern Anatolia and Black Sea regions of Turkey, in the sense that the western road departing from Erzincan towards the Zigana Pass (the key pass between the two geographies) has its last urban stop in Şiran. According to the 2010 census, population of the district is 17,600 of which 8,207 live in the town of Şiran.

See also
İncedere

References

External links
 District governor's official website 
 Road map of Şiran and environs
 Local city forum website 

Populated places in Gümüşhane Province
Districts of Gümüşhane Province